CSC Team O'Grady is a junior cycling development team set up by Australian Olympic champion Stuart O'Grady along with his personal coach Leigh Bryan, manager Max Stevens and Martin Winter.  Team O'Grady had a number of top results in its first year, with 12 National title medals including a national title with Jack Bobridge and Christos Winter.

Team O'Grady are supported by the following sponsors:

CSC
Giant.
Shimano
Polar
Standish Cycles Unley
Unley Nissan
Skins
Rudy Project
Continental
Limar
Malaysia Airlines
Australian Institute of Sport
South Australian Sports Institute
ESP

Team O'Grady main site

CSC Team O'Grady